The list of shipwrecks in June 1859 includes ships sunk, foundered, grounded, or otherwise lost during June 1859.

1 June

2 June

3 June

4 June

5 June

6 June

7 June

8 June

10 June

11 June

12 June

13 June

14 June

15 June

16 June

17 June

18 June

19 June

21 June

22 June

23 June

24 June

.

25 June

26 June

27 June

28 June

30 June

Unknown date

References

1859-06